The Utah Utes women's basketball team represents University of Utah in women's basketball. The school competes in the Pac-12 Conference in Division I of the National Collegiate Athletic Association (NCAA).

Season-by-season record
The Utes have an 864–400 record as of the 2015–16 season, with 17 appearances in the NCAA Tournament (1983, 1986, 1989, 1990, 1991, 1995, 1996, 1997, 1998, 2000, 2001, 2003, 2005, 2006, 2008, 2009, 2011). They have played in five conferences, playing in the Intermountain Athletic Conference (83–11 all-time record, 1974–82), the High Country Athletic Conference (67–13 all-time record, 1982–89), the Western Athletic Conference (99–27 all-time record, 1990–99), the Mountain West Conference (137–43 all-time record, 1999–2011), and the Pac-12 Conference (31–59 record, since 2011) since starting play in 1974. They have also been champions of the regular season in 1996, 2000, 2001, 2003, 2004, 2005, 2008, 2009 and 2023, while appearing in the Women's NIT in 1979, 1984, 1999, 2007, 2010, 2012, 2016. They appeared in the predecessor to the NCAA Tournament (the AIAW) in 1976 and 1977.

NCAA tournament results
The Utes have appeared in 19 NCAA tournaments, with a record of 12-18.

International
Paige Crozon : 2017 Summer Universiade

References

External links